The British National Points Championships are held annually as part of the British National Track Championships organised by British Cycling. A women's championship was held for the first time in 1985.

Men's Senior  Race

Women's Senior Race

Men's Junior Race

Women's Junior Race

Male Youth Race

Female Youth Race

References

Cycle racing in the United Kingdom
National track cycling championships
National championships in the United Kingdom
Annual sporting events in the United Kingdom